The 2013–14 Biathlon World Cup – World Cup 2 was held in Hochfilzen, Austria, from 6 December until 8 December 2013.

Schedule of events

Medal winners

Men

Women 

=

References 

2013–14 Biathlon World Cup
Biathlon World Cup
December 2013 sports events in Europe
Biathlon competitions in Austria
Sport in Tyrol (state)